The Eurofly Fire Cat is an Italian ultralight aircraft that was designed and produced by Eurofly srl of Galliera Veneta. Now out of production, when it was available the aircraft was supplied as a complete ready-to-fly-aircraft or as a kit for amateur construction.

Design and development
The Fire Cat features a strut-braced high-wing, a two-seats-in-side-by-side configuration enclosed cockpit, fixed tricycle landing gear with wheel pants and a single engine in pusher configuration.

The aircraft is made from aluminum tubing, with its flying surfaces covered in Dacron sailcloth envelopes. Each wing is supported by two parallel struts with jury struts. The standard engine used is the  Rotax 503 two-stroke powerplant with standard electric start.

Specifications (Fire Cat)

References

External links
Photo of a Fire Cat

Fire Cat
1990s Italian sport aircraft
1990s Italian ultralight aircraft
Single-engined tractor aircraft
High-wing aircraft
Homebuilt aircraft